The Jeecy-Vea was a Belgian automobile manufactured from 1925 until 1926 by a company more famous for its motor cycles.  A limited-production light car, it was manufactured by a motorcycle factory in Brussels, and featured a 750 cc Coventry-Climax flat-twin engine. Tourer and coupé bodied versions were advertised.

References
David Burgess Wise, The New Illustrated Encyclopedia of Automobiles

Defunct motor vehicle manufacturers of Belgium
Vehicle manufacturing companies established in 1925
Belgian companies established in 1925
Vehicle manufacturing companies disestablished in 1926
1926 disestablishments in Belgium